Windy Gap may refer to:

 Windy Gap (Antarctica), a pass on the Louis Philippe Plateau

 Windy Gap (Wyoming), a mountain pass in Wyoming
 Windy Gap (Fremont County, Wyoming), a mountain pass in Wyoming
 Windy Gap (Lincoln County, Wyoming), a mountain pass in Wyoming

See also
 Windy Gap Reservoir, Granby, Colorado
 
 Windy Pass (disambiguation)
 Windy Saddle (disambiguation)